The decade of the 1710s in archaeology involved some significant events.

Excavations
 Formal excavations continue at Pompeii.

Finds
1710: A few remains of the Temple of Apollo are discovered in Mdina, Malta. Most of the marble blocks were later sculpted into decorative elements for new buildings.
1713: Gold aureus coins found in Transylvania provide the only known evidence for Roman usurper Sponsianus.

Publications
 1717: Michele Mercati's Metallotheca is published, 124 years after his death.
 1719: Natural History and Antiquities of Surrey by Richard Rawlinson.

Births
 1712: 17 May - Jean-Baptiste Greppo, French canon and archaeologist (d. 1767)
 1713: James 'Athenian' Stuart, Scottish archaeologist and architect (d. 1788)
 1716: January 20 - Jean-Jacques Barthélemy, French archaeologist (d. 1795)
 1717: December 9 - Johann Joachim Winckelmann, German art critic and archaeologist (d. 1768)

Deaths
 1715: February 17 - Antoine Galland, French orientalist (b. 1646)

References

Archaeology by decade
Archaeology